That Dirty Black Bag is a Spaghetti Western television series created by Mauro Aragoni, Silvia Ebreul and Marcello Izzo for AMC+. It features an ensemble cast led by Dominic Cooper, Travis Fimmel and Aidan Gillen. The eight-part series was filmed in Italy, Spain and Morocco, and it premiered March 10, 2022.

Premise 
In a town full of bounty hunters, bandits and bloody vendettas, Arthur McCoy is the incorruptible sheriff who’s trying to overcome his troubled past to bring law and order to this new frontier. On the other side of things is Red Bill, an infamous solitary bounty hunter known for decapitating his victims and stuffing their heads into a dirty black bag. When the paths of these two men collide, they both learn that in the wild west, there are no heroes, nobody is invincible, and the predators may become the prey.

Cast
 Dominic Cooper as Arthur McCoy
 Douglas Booth as Red Bill
 Niv Sultan as Eve
 Guido Caprino as Bronson
 Christian Cooke as Steve
 Paterson Joseph as Thompson
 Rose Williams as Symone
 Zoe Boyle as Michelle
 Ivan Shaw as Kurt
 Eugene Brave Rock as The Stranger
 Anna Chancellor as Hellen
 Aidan Gillen as Butler
 Travis Fimmel as Anderson
 Gaia Zampighi as Tara
 Nicolo Pasetti as Martin

Episodes

Production
In December 2019, Mediawan announced they had come on board to distribute That Dirty Black Bag, which had been in various stages of development for several years. In June 2021, BRON Studios and Palomar announced the stars of the series would be Dominic Cooper and Douglas Booth with the ensemble cast for the series also being announced at the same time. The series comes from Italian filmmaker Mauro Aragoni, who co-wrote the series with Silvia Ebreul, Marcello Izzo and Fabio Paladini. Series directors are Brian O’Malley and Aragoni. In November 2021, AMC+ announced that it had acquired That Dirty Black Bag. The 8-part series is being produced in English with three seasons already planned.

References

External links
 
 

2020s Western (genre) television series
Italian Western (genre) television series
Spaghetti Western television series